Delbert Leonard Bjork (June 27, 1914 – August 26, 1988) was a professional American football tackle in the National Football League (NFL). He played two seasons for the Chicago Bears (1937–1938).

Bjork was born in Deep River, Washington and grew up in Astoria, Oregon. He played football for Astoria High School and then for at the University of Oregon from 1934 to 1936. On September 1, 1937, Bjork played with the College All-Stars against the Green Bay Packers at Soldier Field in Chicago. The All-Stars won that game 6–0. After receiving his BS in physical education from the University of Oregon in 1937 he was drafted by the Chicago Bears in the sixth round. In 1940 Bjork earned an MS in education from the University of Oregon. He then went on to have a successful career in the military.

Bjork was awarded the Purple Heart with oak leaf clusters in 1944. As a captain he was recognized with the Distinguished Service Cross for his World War II service. After the war he continued his career in the military earning the rank of colonel and was published in Military Review in 1951.

Bjork was inducted into the Oregon Sports Hall of Fame in 1982.

References

External links
 

1914 births
1988 deaths
American football tackles
Chicago Bears players
Oregon Ducks football players
United States Army personnel of the Korean War
United States Army personnel of World War II
Recipients of the Distinguished Service Cross (United States)
United States Army colonels
People from Astoria, Oregon
People from Wahkiakum County, Washington
Players of American football from Oregon